The United Party (PP) is a political party that once existed in Indonesia.

History 
United Party was founded by Djaelani Naro (HJ. Naro) and some other members of United Development Party (PPP) that were disappointed with the result of PPP's muktamar. The goal of the party's foundation is not to challenge PPP, but to accommodate PPP members so that they do not join other parties. The party has a symbol of a yellow star, the former PPP logo, and Islam is the party's ideology.

1999 legislative election 
The party received 655,052 votes or 0.62% of the total votes in the 1999 legislative election. The party got one seat in the People's Representative Council (DPR).

See also 
 United Development Party

References

External links 
 Party profile in seasite.niu.edu

Political parties established in 1999
Political parties in Indonesia